Lizhen Ji (Chinese: 季理真; born 1964), is a Chinese-American mathematician.  He is a professor of mathematics at the University of Michigan, Ann Arbor.

Biography

April 1964, Ji was born in Wenzhou, Zhejiang Province, China. Ji graduated BS from Hangzhou University (previous and current Zhejiang University) in Hangzhou in 1984. From 1984 to 1985, Ji was a master student at the Department of Mathematics of Hangzhou University. Ji went to United States to continue his study in 1985, and in 1987 Ji obtained MS from the Department of Mathematics of the University of California, San Diego. In 1991, Ji obtained PhD from the Northeastern University (doctoral advisors: R. Mark Goresky and Shing-Tung Yau).

From 1991 to 1994, Ji was C.L.E. Moore instructor at the Department of Mathematics of MIT. From 1994 to 1995, Ji was a member of the Institute for Advanced Study School of Mathematics in Princeton, New Jersey. From 1995 to 1999, Ji was an assistant professor at the Department of Mathematics, University of Michigan (UM). From 1999 to 2005, Ji was an associate professor at the same department. In 2005, Ji was promoted to full professor at UM.

Awards
From 1998 to 2001, Ji was an Alfred P. Sloan Research Fellow. Ji received the Silver Morningside Medal of Mathematics in 2007. Ji was a Simons Fellow in 2014.

Publications

Besides academic papers, Ji has also published or co-written many influential books in mathematics, including:
 Compactifications of Symmetric and Locally Symmetric Spaces; by Armand Borel, and Lizhen Ji.
 Arithmetic Groups and Their Generalizations: What, Why, and How; by Lizhen Ji.
 Geometry, Analysis and Topology of Discrete Groups; co-edited by Lizhen Ji, Kefeng Liu, Yang Lo, and Shing-Tung Yau.
 Compactifications of Symmetric Spaces (Progress in Mathematics, Vol 156); by Y. Guivarc'H, Lizhen Ji, and J. C. Taylor.
 Geometry Analysis and Topology of Discrete Groups; by Lizhen Ji, Kefeng Liu, and Yang Lo.
 Handbook of Geometric Analysis; by Lizhen Ji.
 Mathematics and Mathematical People; Chief-editor Lizhen Ji.
 Advanced Lectures in Mathematics; Chief-editor Lizhen Ji.

Editorial Work

 An editor of the Asian Journal of Mathematics
 An editor of Science in China, Series A: Mathematics
 A founding editor and chief editor of Pure and Applied Mathematics Quarterly
 One of the chief-editors of a book series on Popular Mathematics Mathematics and Humanities

References

External links
 The homepage of Lizhen Ji
 The Mathematics Genealogy Project - Lizhen Ji
 Lizhen Ji's homepage at Zhejiang University
 ScienceNet: 季理真：追求真爱的数学人 (Lizhen Ji: Who Loves Math)

1964 births
Living people
20th-century American mathematicians
21st-century American mathematicians
Chinese emigrants to the United States
Hangzhou University alumni
Massachusetts Institute of Technology School of Science faculty
Northeastern University alumni
Educators from Wenzhou
Sloan Research Fellows
University of California, San Diego alumni
University of Michigan faculty
Zhejiang University alumni
Mathematicians from Zhejiang
Scientists from Wenzhou